J. A. Palmer may refer to:

People
 James A. Palmer, the photographer who signed his work J. A. Palmer

Ship
 USS J. A. Palmer (SP-319)